Vera-Ellen (born Vera-Ellen Rohe; February 16, 1921 – August 30, 1981) was an American dancer and actress. She is remembered for her solo performances as well as her work with partners Fred Astaire, Gene Kelly, Danny Kaye, and Donald O'Connor. She is best known for her starring roles in On the Town (1949) with Gene Kelly and White Christmas (1954) with Danny Kaye.

Early life
Vera-Ellen Rohe was born in Norwood, Ohio, to Martin F. Rohe, a piano dealer, and Alma C. Westmeier.  Both were descended from German immigrants. Her hyphenated first name originated in a dream that her mother had and that her  mother saw it in the “Lights.”

She began dancing at age 10 and quickly became proficient. One of her fellow dance students at Hessler Studio of Dancing was Doris Day. At age 13, she was a winner on the Major Bowes Amateur Hour and embarked upon a professional career.

Career

Stage
In 1939, she made her Broadway debut in the Jerome Kern/Oscar Hammerstein musical Very Warm for May. She became one of the youngest Rockettes at Radio City Music Hall. This led to roles on Broadway in Panama Hattie, By Jupiter, and A Connecticut Yankee, where she was spotted by Samuel Goldwyn, who cast her opposite Danny Kaye and Virginia Mayo in the 1945 film Wonder Man.

Dubbing
Starting in 1945 with Wonder Man, her first film, her singing was dubbed. However, the Decca Broadway Original Cast Album of 1943's revival of A Connecticut Yankee has two vocals by Vera-Ellen, "I Feel at Home with You" and "You Always Love the Same Girl," both duets with Chester Stratton.  Her style is of a comic soubrette.

Film
She danced with Gene Kelly in the Hollywood musicals Words and Music and On the Town, while also appearing in the last Marx Brothers film, Love Happy. She received top billing alongside Fred Astaire in the musicals Three Little Words and The Belle of New York. She had a co-starring role with Donald O'Connor in the Ethel Merman vehicle Call Me Madam. She also starred in the 1951 musical comedy 'Happy Go Lovely' alongside David Niven and Cesar Romero. Vera-Ellen's penultimate film role was the 1954 blockbuster hit White Christmas, co-starring with Bing Crosby, Danny Kaye, and Rosemary Clooney. She starred in only one more film, the 1957 British production Let's Be Happy.

Television
Vera-Ellen was a reasonably frequent guest on US variety programming in the mid-to-late 1950s.  Her final performances were on a November 22, 1958, television episode of The Perry Como Show and a February 14, 1959, broadcast of The Dinah Shore Show.  Following that, Vera-Ellen retired from performing.

Personal life
According to Hollywood chronicler Brian Cronin, what he describes as Vera-Ellen's "extremely thin" appearance led to rumors during her career that she had an eating disorder. A rumor that her neck was always covered during the filming of White Christmas because of wrinkling caused by supposed anorexia persists to this day. However, pictures and video taken at the same time show her neck appearing normal and undamaged. A friend, Bill Dennington, who knew her during the last 20 years of her life, dismissed the story about her neck and added that he hated "that people think of her as 'the dancer with anorexia' and not just the fabulous dancer who has been so overlooked."

Her niece by marriage, Ileana Rothschild, born in 1967, remembered that her aunt "never stopped taking dance classes and maintained her slim figure always."  She was also an "avid swimmer," who used a swimming program to recover from a mild stroke late in her life. According to Rothschild, she had no eating disorder.

Vera-Ellen was married twice. Her first husband was a fellow dancer, Robert Hightower, to whom she was married from February 1941 to November 1946. Her second husband was oilman Victor Rothschild. They were married from 1954 to 1966 when they divorced. While married to Rothschild, she gave birth to a daughter, Victoria Ellen, who died in 1963 at three months from SIDS. Following the death of her only child, she withdrew from public life.

Death
Vera-Ellen died at the Los Angeles County General Hospital on August 30, 1981, of ovarian cancer. She was 60 years old. She is buried at Glen Haven Memorial Park in Sylmar, Los Angeles.

Filmography

Stage work
 Very Warm for May (1939)
 Higher and Higher (1940)
 Panama Hattie (1940)
 By Jupiter (1942)
 A Connecticut Yankee (1943)

Radio appearances

References

Further reading
 Oderman, Stuart, Talking to the Piano Player 2: Stars, Writers, and Bandleaders Remember. BearManor Media, 2009. .
 Soren, David, Vera-Ellen: The Magic and the Mystery. Luminary Press, Baltimore, 2003. .

External links

 
 
 
 Vera-Ellen at Virtual History
 Vera-Ellen Tribute

1921 births
1981 deaths
20th-century American actresses
Actresses from Ohio
American ballerinas
American female dancers
American film actresses
American jazz dancers
American tap dancers
Ohio Republicans
California Republicans
American musical theatre actresses
American people of German descent
Deaths from cancer in California
Deaths from ovarian cancer
People from Norwood, Ohio
The Rockettes
20th-century American singers
20th-century American women singers
20th-century American ballet dancers